A Blue Cruise, also known as a Blue Voyage or Blue Tour, is a term used for recreational voyages along the Turkish Riviera, on Turkey's southwestern coast along the Aegean and Mediterranean seas. The cruise is typically a week-long trip aboard the local gulet schooners, to ancient cities, harbors, tombs, and beaches in the numerous small coves along the country's Turquoise Coast.

Carian Cruise is a lesser-known synonym used by some sources internationally, in reference to the term Caria — the name this region of southwest Turkey was called in ancient times.

History
The term Blue Voyage, which is used in Turkey's tourism industry, has its origins in Turkish literature, deriving from the title of a book by Azra Erhat, and was first introduced into Turkish literature by a handful of writers, such as Cevat Şakir Kabaağaçlı (alias The Fisherman of Halicarnassus). The author, who had been exiled to Bodrum in 1925, began taking trips with his friends on the local sponge divers' sailing boats, called gulets, and was moved and inspired by the local culture and natural beauty. These excursions became known as "Blue Voyages".

Fellow author Sabahattin Eyüboğlu, together with his circle of family and friends, participated in Blue Cruises, as did Azra Erhat. The literary review "Yeni Ufuklar" (New Horizons) in the 1950s and 1960s contributed to publicizing the Blue Cruise, and numerous guidebooks were published in Turkish  and German presenting romantic depictions of the voyage.  Since that time, cruise tourism has grown to support a sizable portion of the local economy, and transformed Bodrum from a fishing village to a holiday destination.

Routes
The routes can be as short as traveling to a few coves for a couple days, or can be as extensive as traveling the entire length of the Turkish Riviera across several weeks. There are options to start a voyage in the Turquoise Coast including Bodrum, Marmaris, Fethiye and Antalya en route to the smaller villages and coves like Dalyan, Gökova, Kekova, and similar destinations, which constitute the more popular portions of the route. It is also possible to visit Greece, and surrounding Greek islands.

See also
 Marinas in Turkey
 Tirhandil
 Gulet

References

Further reading
 

Tourism in Turkey
Maritime industries in Turkey
Turkish literature
Turkish Riviera